Cian Wright (born 1999), known professionally as Clavish, is a British rapper from Stamford Hill, London. He is currently signed to the German-British Universal subsidiary, Polydor Records. He is noted for his signature flow on trap and drill beats. In December 2022, Clavish earned his first UK Top 10 with the D-Block Europe-assisted "Rocket Science" which peaked at number 9 on the UK Singles Chart. His first mixtape Rap Game Awful released on 13 January 2023 and debuted at number 4 on the UK Albums Chart.

Career

2018–2021:  Career beginnings and 2022 
Clavish began rapping in 2018 with the release of "All These Funds". Following a quiet 2019, Clavish broke through with his appearance on GRM Daily's "Daily Duppy" series with his own reaching over ten million views on YouTube. In 2021, Clavish released the singles "One of a Kind" in August and "Like This" in November, and followed up with his debut EP 2022 in December.

2022–present: Rap Game Awful
Clavish released the single "Sold Out Dates" in March which marked his first UK debut at number 93. This was later followed by the song "Greece" which peaked at number 70. Off of the momentum from the two previous singles, Clavish released "Public Figure" which peaked at number 66, marking his highest charting song at the time. The song also received a co-sign from Drake's OVO Sound Radio. This was later followed by the D-Block Europe-assisted "Rocket Science" in November which earned Clavish his first top-ten single, peaking at number 9 on the UK Singles Chart. The single was accompanied by the announcement of Clavish's debut mixtape, Rap Game Awful. The mixtape was supported by the singles "Traumatised" and "No Difference" and released on 13 January 2023, debuting at number 4 on the UK Albums Chart.

Discography

Mixtapes

Extended plays

Singles

As lead artist

As a featured artist

Other charted songs

Guest appearances

References

External links
  – official site

1999 births
Living people
Black British male rappers
English hip hop musicians
English male rappers
Rappers from London
UK drill musicians
Gangsta rappers